The Fulton class was a class of seven United States Navy submarine tenders. The class took its name from the lead ship, which was commissioned 27 December 1940 by Mare Island Navy Yard and sponsored by Mrs. A. T. Sutcliffe, great-granddaughter of Robert Fulton. Fulton was commissioned on 12 September 1941. The basic hull and superstructure for this class was the same as the Dixie-class destroyer tenders and Vulcan-class repair ships.

Ships in class 

In 1959-1960, Proteus  was converted to a tender for the Polaris Fleet Ballistic Missile submarines, including the addition of a 13.4 m section amidships. All ships of this class have been decommissioned and scrapped.

See also
 Norwalk Class Cargo Ships

References

External links
Submarine tender photo gallery index at NavSource.org

 

 
 Fulton-class
 Fulton-class
 Fulton-class
 Fulton-class